Jeffery D. Broadwater (born 1967) is a United States Army major general who serves as deputy commanding general of V Corps. He previously served as commanding general of the 1st Cavalry Division from October 3, 2019 to July 21, 2021. Prior to that, he served as commanding general of the Fort Irwin National Training Center from November 2016 to September 2019.

Broadwater was among 14 Fort Hood military leaders fired or suspended from duty by then-Secretary of the Army Ryan D. McCarthy for creating a "permissive environment" that let crimes up to sexual harassment and assault occur with little punitive action, per an investigation into the death of Vanessa Guillén. He ultimately did not face any disciplinary action, but was consequently not present at the 1st Cavalry's change of command ceremony in July 2021.

In July 2021 MG Broadwater was cleared and is “not pending any adverse action as a result of either the Fort Hood Independent Review or the Army Regulation 15-6 into the climate and culture of the 1st Cavalry Division,” reads a statement issued by Army Headquarters at the Pentagon.

References

Date of birth missing (living people)
Living people
University of Kentucky alumni
United States Army Command and General Staff College alumni
National War College alumni
Recipients of the Defense Superior Service Medal
Recipients of the Legion of Merit
United States Army Rangers
United States Army generals
1967 births